Fertilizer Corporation of India  is an Indian central public sector undertaking under the ownership of Ministry of Chemicals and Fertilizers, Government of India.
 in India. 
 It began in 1961 when Indian government consolidated several state run fertiliser companies into a single SBU. FCI has manufacturing units in five states: Sindri complex (Jharkhand), Gorakhpur complex (Uttar Pradesh), Ramagundam complex (Telangana), Talcher complex (Odisha) and an un-commissioned project in Korba (Chhattisgarh). The organisation was declared "sick" in 1992 and in 2002 the government of India initiated actions to close it. It has been seeking to restart operations and as of May 2010 had received initial approvals of a government loan forgiveness plan which would allow operations to restart in five of its units.

In 1978, FCIL was re-organised and five separate entities were formed – FCIL, National Fertilizers Limited (NFL), Hindustan Fertilizer Corporation Limited (HFCL), Rashtriya Chemicals & Fertilizers (RCF) and Projects and Development India Limited (PDIL) – (earlier the technology and development wing known as P & D). In the mid 1990s, FCI employed around 28,000 people and was one of the largest public-sector companies in India.

Apart from these manufacturing units, there were nine gypsum-producing units under Fertilizer Corporation of India Limited operating through another division, the Jodhpur Mining Organization – now renamed FCI Aravali Gypsum and Minerals India Limited (FAGMIL). Under the Sick Industrial Companies (Special Provisions) Act 1985, the Board for Industrial and Financial Reconstruction (BIFR) declared the Fertilizer Corporation of India Limited sick in 1992. Within the next decade, the Indian government concluded that all fertilizer production units of FCIL except Jodhpur Mining Organization were incurring heavy losses and decided to close FCIL. However, the main reasons for the loss incurred by FCIL were higher incidence of interest, higher input costs especially the power tariffs by the concerned State Electricity Boards and the associated raw materials, and higher consumption which was not reimbursed by the FICC.

The main products of Fertilizer Corporation of India Limited were Ammonia, Urea, Nitric Acid, Ammonium Bicarbonate, Gypsum, and Ammonium Nitrate in varied forms such as Prill, Flake, and Melt.

Revival 
Considering the shortage of domestic production of Urea in meeting the overall domestic demand of Urea, the Cabinet decided in April 2007 to consider the feasibility of reviving the Fertilizer Corporation of India. Subsequently, Cabinet constituted an Empowered Committee of Secretaries (ECOS) on 30 October 2008 to consider various options of revival and further approved 'in principle' to consider waiver of GOI Loan & Interest, in case of availability of a viable revival proposal. After detailed study and recommendations for a revival option, ECOS on 24 August 2009 selected a suitable Revival Model and recommended the same for seeking the approval of GoI.

As on date, three entities have been formed to revive the following units:

a. Talcher Fertilizers Limited: GAIL + RCF + CIL + FCIL (GAIL: Gas Authority of India Ltd, RCF: Rashtriya Chemicals & Fertilizers, CIL: Coal India)

b. Ramagundam Fertilizers & Chemicals Limited: NFL + EIL +FCIL (NFL: National Fertilizers, EIL: Engineers India)

c. Hindustan Urvarak & Rasayan Limited: IOCL + NTPC + CIL + FCIL & HFCL (IOCL: Indian Oil Corporation, NTPC: National Thermal Power Corporation), CIL: Coal India.

TFL Talcher is setting up a Coal gasification-based fertilizer complex.

RFCL Ramagundam is setting up a natural-gas-based fertilizer complex.

HURL is setting up three gas-based fertilizer units in Sindri, Gorakhpur and Barauni.

References

Government-owned companies of India
Fertilizer companies of India
Indian companies established in 1961